Zgornja Ščavnica is a settlement in the Municipality of Sveta Ana in the Slovene Hills in northeastern Slovenia. It lies in the upper Ščavnica Valley.

References

External links
Zgornja Ščavnica on Geopedia

Populated places in the Municipality of Sveta Ana